Suuri-Pieksä is a medium-sized lake of Finland. It belongs to the Vuoksi main catchment area. It is located in the Northern Savonia region and Juankoski municipality.

See also
List of lakes in Finland

References

Lakes of Kuopio